Leopold Albu (1860–1937) was a gold magnate. He was born in Berlin, Germany. He arrived in South Africa in 1875 and settled in Kimberley, Northern Cape with his brother George. In 1891, he moved to Johannesburg. Later, he served as a resident-partner in London, co-founding the General Mining and Finance Corporation.

Sources 
 Ensiklopedie van Suidelike Afrika, Eric Rosenthal, 1967

South African mining businesspeople
1860 births
1937 deaths
Randlords
German emigrants to South Africa
German emigrants to England
Businesspeople from Berlin